The Arabian banded whipray (Maculabatis randalli), is a species of stingray in the family Dasyatidae.
It is native to the Persian Gulf.

Etymology
The ray is named in honor of John E. Randall (1924–2020), of the Bishop Museum in Honolulu.

References

Arabian banded whipray
Fish of the Persian Gulf
Taxa named by Peter R. Last
Taxa named by Bernadette Mabel Manjaji-Matsumoto
Taxa named by Alec B. M. Moore
Arabian banded whipray